Munnibai is a Hindi low budget action movie of Bollywood directed by Kanti Shah and produced by Gulab Seikh. This film was released on 30 July 1999 under the banner of Gulab Films.

Plot
This is a revenge story of a lady dacoit Munnibai. Her family was killed by a gang of dacoit. Munnibai kills the chief of this gang. Chief's daughter Hirabai is another lady dacoit who tries to kill Munni in reply. But finally Munni kills Hirabai.

Cast
 Dharmendra
 Johnny Lever as Kammal Khan
 Rajesh Vivek
 Joginder
 Mohan Joshi
 Sapna (actress) as Hirabai
 Anil Nagrath
 Durgesh Nandini as Munnibai
 Gulshan Rana
 Joy Thakur
 Vinod Tripathi
 Arun Mathur

References

External links
 

1999 films
1990s Hindi-language films
Indian action films
Indian rape and revenge films
Films about outlaws
Indian films about revenge
1999 action films
Films directed by Kanti Shah